Blennioclinus stella, the Silverbubble klipfish, is a species of clinid found in subtropical waters of the southeastern Atlantic and western Indian Ocean along the South African coast down to a depth of about .  This species can reach a maximum length of  TL.

Description
Fins: Dorsal fin spines 24 to 28, rays 6 to 7; Anal fin spines 2, rays 19 to 21; Pectoral fin rays 12; Ventral fin spines 1, rays 3. 
Gill rakers (1 to 2)+(4 to 6). 
Vertebrae 13+(25 to 27). 
Lateral line with about 20 to 25 vertical pairs of pores in front.
Body depth 5.25 to 5.75 in Standard length.
Head length 3.75 to 5.25 in Standard length.
Eye 2.5 to 3.25 diameters in head length. 
Caudal peduncle 27.5 to 33% head length, depth 27.5 to 33.5% head length.

Shape

Head short , the anterior profile  The front of the head between mouth and eyes is almost vertical but changes to nearly horizontal behind the eyes. There is a wider gap between the third and fourth dorsal fin spines than between the rest, with a deep notch forming a dorsal crest. The dorsal spines decrease in height towards the tail to form a deep notch between spiny and softer rayed portions of the dorsal fin. There are clusters of cirri at tips of the first three dorsal spines. 
The pectoral fins are rounded and the caudal peduncle short. No supraorbital tentacles are present. The cirri on the anterior nostrils are elongated, narrow at the base and expanded and deeply serrated at the tips.

Colour

Body colour variably brown, red and orange mottled, or greenish. Three narrow bars across the head and one through the eye to the cheek. Eight to ten vertical bars on the body, extending to the dorsal fin. Sometimes iridescent silvery patches along the sides.
flanks.

Size

The smallest of the South African clinids, mature at 38mm, attains 50mm.

Distribution
  
Subtidal and intertidal from Algoa Bay to north of Durban, not common in southern part of range, common subtidally down to 10m along the Transkei coast.

Habitat

Not uncommon in tide pools at the bottom of the shore, among sand and pebbles and under rocks., but appears to be more common subtidally.
Adept at concealment in crevices, also buries itself on its side in sand.

References

stella
Fish described in 1846
Fish of the Atlantic Ocean
Fish of the Indian Ocean